W.Pudupatti is a panchayat town in Virudhunagar district, Tamil Nadu. It is under Srivilliputtur Assembly constituency and Tenkasi LokSabha constituency.

Demographics
 India census, W.Pudupatti had a population of 14,846. Males constituted 48% of the population and females 52%. W.Pudupatti has an average literacy rate of 74%, higher than the national average of 60%: male literacy is 76%, and female literacy is 72%. In W.Pudupatti, 12% of the population is under 6 years of age.

Most of its residents are farmers.

Location 
Wikmapia

References

Cities and towns in Virudhunagar district